Craig Steven Reichert (born May 11, 1974) is a Canadian former professional ice hockey winger who played three games for the Mighty Ducks of Anaheim during the 1996–97 NHL season.  Reichert was drafted 67th overall by the Ducks in the 1994 NHL Entry Draft and had spells in the International Hockey League for the San Diego Gulls and the American Hockey League for the Baltimore Bandits, Cincinnati Mighty Ducks and the Louisville Panthers.  He then moved to Germany's Deutsche Eishockey Liga with Düsseldorfer EG in 2000.  He had one more season in the AHL for the Hamilton Bulldogs before retiring.

Career statistics

External links

1974 births
Living people
Anaheim Ducks draft picks
Baltimore Bandits players
Canadian ice hockey right wingers
Cincinnati Mighty Ducks players
Düsseldorfer EG players
Hamilton Bulldogs (AHL) players
Ice hockey people from Winnipeg
Louisville Panthers players
Mighty Ducks of Anaheim players
Red Deer Rebels players
San Diego Gulls (IHL) players
Spokane Chiefs players
Canadian expatriate ice hockey players in Germany